Johnstown Jr.-Senior High School is a public high school located at 1 Sir Bills Circle, in Johnstown, New York. Part of the Greater Johnstown School District, the school provides education in grades 7–12. It offers summer school for pupils who want extra classes or need to make up failed classes. It offers various athletic activities such as soccer, football, track and field, hockey, basketball, and has a FOJO swim team.

Notable alumni
 Barbara McMartin (1931–2005), class of 1949, PhD in mathematics from City University of New York; environmental activist and author of 25 books on the Adirondack Mountains and park.

References

External links
Website

Public high schools in New York (state)
Schools in Fulton County, New York